The 1955–56 Scottish Cup was the 71st staging of Scotland's most prestigious football knockout competition. The Cup was won by Heart of Midlothian who defeated Celtic in the final. The final was a repeat of the 1907 final and was Hearts' first appearance in the final since that date.

First round

Replays

Second round

Third round

Replays

Fourth round

Replays

Second replays

Third replays

Fifth round

Replays

Sixth round

Replays

Quarter-finals

Semi-finals

Replay

Final

See also 
 1955–56 in Scottish football
 1955–56 Scottish League Cup

References

External links 
 Report from 1956 Final, London Hearts Supporters' Club

Scottish Cup seasons
1955–56 in Scottish football
Scot